The list of ship decommissionings in 1940 includes a chronological list of ships decommissioned in 1940.  In cases where no official decommissioning ceremony was held, the date of withdrawal from service may be used instead.  Notably, several destroyers were decommissioned by the United States Navy during 1940 for immediate transfer to the Royal Navy under the Destroyers for Bases Agreement between the two nations.


References

See also 

1940
 Ship decommissionings
 Ship launches
Ship launches